Žagunis is a Lithuanian-language surname, Its feminine forms are: Žagunienė, Žagūnienė (married woman or widow) and Žagunytė, Žagūnaitė (unmarried woman). Notable people with the surname include:

Mark Zagunis, American professional baseball outfielder 
Mariel Leigh Zagunis, American sabre fencer
Robert Zagunis, American rower

Lithuanian-language surnames